Captain Scarface is a 1953 American thriller film directed by Paul Guilfoyle.

Plot
In the waters off South America, the Soviets torpedo the tramp steamer and banana boat SS Baños and murder the survivors with the cooperation of the ship's radioman, Clegg who escapes with his life and a promise of $5000.  The Soviets have mocked up their own ship as the SS Baños that contains an atomic device with the goal of sailing the Baños to the locks of the Panama Canal where they will detonate their ship on an atomic suicide mission.

To avoid suspicion the new crew of the mocked up Baños takes the contingent of passengers scheduled to sail on the original Baños.  One last minute addition is American expatriate Sam Wilton who has overstayed his welcome as a plantation overseer by making love to the plantation owner's wife.  As a result, Sam and his lover's husband are both wounded in a gunfight.  Sam needs to escape to the United States without his passport that is still at the plantation.

At the Los Rios Hotel in the port city of San Brejo that is also Sam's watering hole, Sam asks his friend Manuel the owner to get him a passport in a false name to escape the vengeance of the plantation owner and the sympathetic local authorities. As Sam waits and drinks he observes the passengers of the SS Baños in the hotel; an older American couple Fred and Kate Dilts, American Everett Crofton, the mysterious Mr Kroll, and two Germans, Dr Yeager and his daughter Elsa. The new Captain of the Baños, "Captain Scarface" sends Clegg to meet Kroll at the Los Rios Hotel for his just reward.  When the passengers are taken to the Baños, Kroll, Clegg and Sam remain behind at the hotel.  In the interest of economy and security, Kroll attempts to murder Clegg, but Clegg kills Kroll first.  Escaping with the money, Clegg shoots at Manuel and Sam, who responds by shooting Clegg.  Never wasting an opportunity, Sam splits the $5000 with Manuel and modifies the late Mr Kroll's passport with own photograph, and takes Kroll's boarding pass to the Baños.

Boarding the ship, Sam as Kroll delays meeting Captain Scarface in order to interview Elsa to find out the lay of the land.  He pieces together that Dr. Yeager is a German atomic scientist allowed to escape from the Soviet Union in order to work the atomic device in exchange for the safety of his daughter, and Kroll was a Soviet agent assigned to bring in the Yeagers and kill Clegg.

Also on the ship is a venomous fer-de-lance snake concealed in a cargo of bananas.

Cast
Barton MacLane as Capt. 'Scarface' Trednor
Virginia Grey as Elsa Yeager
Leif Erickson as Sam Wilton
Peter Coe as Perro, Trednor's Mate
Rudolph Anders as Dr. Yeager
Howard Wendell as Fred Dilts, passenger
Isabel Randolph as Kate Dilts, passenger
Paul Brinegar as Clegg, saboteur
Don Dillaway as Everett Crofton, passenger
Martin Garralaga as Manuel, tavern keeper
John Mylong as Kroll, Soviet

External links

1953 films
1950s thriller drama films
American thriller drama films
1950s English-language films
American black-and-white films
Cold War espionage
Cold War spy films
American anti-communist propaganda films
Films about nuclear war and weapons
1950s action films
1953 romantic drama films
1953 directorial debut films
Films directed by Paul Guilfoyle
1950s American films